Thomas P. Mack, Jr. (26 November 1913 – 7 October 2002) was an American coxswain. He competed at the 1928 Summer Olympics in Amsterdam with the men's coxed pair where they were eliminated in the round one repechage.

References

1913 births
2002 deaths
American male rowers
Olympic rowers of the United States
Rowers at the 1928 Summer Olympics
Rowers at the 1932 Summer Olympics
Rowers from Philadelphia
Coxswains (rowing)
European Rowing Championships medalists